The FIS Cross-Country Far East Cup is a series of cross-country skiing events arranged by the International Ski Federation (FIS). The Cup is one of the nine FIS Cross-Country Continental Cups, a series of second-level cross-country skiing competitions ranked below the Cross-Country World Cup. The Far East is open for competitors from all nations, but eight main countries are associated to the Far East Cup, these are; China, Iran, Japan, Mongolia, North Korea, South Korea, Chinese Taipei and Uzbekistan. 

The Far East Cup has been held annually since the 2004–05 season.

World Cup qualification
In the end of certain periods, the overall leaders for both genders receive a place in the World Cup in the following period. The overall winners of the season receive a place in the World Cup in the beginning of the following season.

Overall winners

Men

Women

References

External links

Far East Cup
Recurring sporting events established in 2004